The Greenfield News is a weekly newspaper founded in 1936 serving the city of Greenfield, California and the surrounding areas of southern Monterey County. Its circulation is estimated at 1,150 copies. It is a product of South County Newspapers, along with the King City Rustler, Gonzales Tribune, and Soledad Bee.

History 
In 1905, Fred Godfrey Vivian, the publisher of the King City Rustler, was contracted by the Clark Colony Water Company to publish the Greenfield Courier for one year. Although short lived, the Courier was very effective in drawing inquiries and people to the community of Clark's Colony from across the country, before Greenfield was incorporated in 1947.

In 1936 the by Vivian and his family began publishing the Greenfield News. Irwin Coffey was listed as publisher in 1952. During the 1960s, Vivian's daughter Beatrice Vivian Casey assumed ownership along with her son Harry Casey. Harry Casey published the newspaper until 1995, when it was sold to Rochelle, Ill.-based News Media Corporation, along with the King City Rustler, Soledad Bee, and the Gonzales Tribune.

Ryan Cronk was appointed the managing editor in 2017.

After 23 years of ownership by News Media Corp., the Greenfield News and its sister publications were purchased by California publisher New SV Media, which owns the Gilroy Dispatch, Morgan Hill Times and Hollister Free Lance, on July 1, 2019.

Awards 
California News Publisher Association

2017 - 2nd Place Coverage of Youth & Education

References 

Weekly newspapers published in California
Monterey County, California